Stara Białka  is a village in the administrative district of Gmina Lubawka, within Kamienna Góra County, Lower Silesian Voivodeship, in south-western Poland.

External links
 Stara Białka - Alt Weißbach na portalu polska-org.pl

References

Villages in Kamienna Góra County